Michael Freiberg (born 10 October 1990) is an Australian track and road cyclist, who currently rides for UCI Continental team .

Career

Track career
At the 2010 Commonwealth Games, Freiberg was part of the Australian squad which took gold in the team pursuit, and also took an individual silver in the scratch race.  He became world champion in the omnium event at the 2011 UCI Track Cycling World Championships. However Cycling Australia did not select him for either the team pursuit or omnium at the 2012 UCI Track Cycling World Championships, thus preventing him from defending his title on home soil in Melbourne, and he was similarly not picked for the Australian squad for the 2012 Summer Olympics, being passed over in favour of Glenn O'Shea for the omnium in both championships.

Hiatus
Freiberg subsequently put his racing career on hold in order to develop the Automated Integrated Resistance hub (AIRhub), a resistance training unit designed to simulate mountain riding on flat roads, which is used by a number of UCI WorldTour professionals in their training, including André Greipel, Mathew Hayman, Adam Hansen, Esteban Chaves and Luke Durbridge.

Return to cycling
Freiberg subsequently returned to competition in 2017, joining  in May of that year with the aim of competing for Australia at the 2018 Commonwealth Games on the Gold Coast, Queensland. In 2019 Freiberg won the Australian National Road Race Championships.

Major results

Road
2012
 2nd Overall Olympia's Tour
 Oceania Road Championships
3rd Time trial
5th Road race
 3rd Trofeo Internazionale Bastianelli
2017
 6th Grand Prix de la ville de Pérenchies
2018
 4th Ronde van Overijssel
 6th Overall Tour of China II
2019
 1st  Road race, National Road Championships
 3rd Time trial, Oceania Road Championships
 9th Halle–Ingooigem
2022
 3rd  Time trial, Oceania Road Championships

References

External links

1990 births
Living people
Australian male cyclists
Place of birth missing (living people)
UCI Track Cycling World Champions (men)
Cyclists at the 2010 Commonwealth Games
Commonwealth Games medallists in cycling
Commonwealth Games gold medallists for Australia
Commonwealth Games silver medallists for Australia
Australian track cyclists
Medallists at the 2010 Commonwealth Games